The 2022 Oklahoma House of Representative election took place on November 8, 2022. The primary elections for the Republican. Democratic, and Libertarian parties' nominations took place on June 28, 2022. All candidates filed between the days of April 13–15, 2022. Oklahoma voters elected state representatives in all 101 House districts. State Representatives served two-year terms in the Oklahoma House of Representatives.

The 2022 election cycle was the first election following redistricting. Redistricting in Oklahoma was postponed to a special legislative session, because of the 2020 United States census data's release being delayed . New state house districts were signed into law based on data from the 2020 United States census on November 22, 2021.

Republicans went into the 2022 election with a supermajority of seats in the state house over Democrats: 82 (R) to 19 (D).

Retirements and vacancies
There are 14 open seats for the Oklahoma House of Representatives. 5 Republicans and 1 Democrat that are term limited. 4 Republicans and 3 Democrats retired. 1 Democrat resigned before the elections.

Republicans 
Retiring
District 13: Avery Frix retired to run for U. S. representative in Oklahoma's 2nd congressional district.
District 31: Garry Mize retired.
District 69: Sheila Dills retired.
District 70: Carol Bush retired.
Term Limited
District 21: Dustin Roberts retired due to term limits and to run for U. S. representative in Oklahoma's 2nd congressional district.
District 36: Sean Roberts retired due to term limits and to run for U. S. representative in Oklahoma's 3rd congressional district.
District 49: Tommy Hardin retired due to term limits.
District 55: Todd Russ retired due to term limits and to run for treasurer of Oklahoma.
District 66: Jadine Nollan retired due to term limits.

Democrats 
Resignations
District 89: Jose Cruz resigned on January 21, 2022, leaving district 89's seat vacant until after the 2022 elections
Retiring
District 45: Merleyn Bell retired.
District 71: Denise Brewer retired. 
District 87: Collin Walke retired.
Term Limited
District 44: Emily Virgin retired due to term limits.

New members elected

Incumbents defeated

In primaries

Republicans
District 11: Wendi Stearman lost renomination to John Kane.
District 24: Logan Phillips lost renomination to Chris Banning.

Open Seats
District 13: Won by Neil Hays.
District 21: Won by Cody Maynard.
District 31: Won by Collin Duel.
District 36: Won by  John George.
District 44: Won by Jared Deck.
District 45: Won by Annie Menz.
District 49: Won by Josh Cantrell.
District 55: Won by Nick Archer.
District 66: Won by Clay Staires.
District 69: Won by Mark Tedford.
District 70: Won by Suzanne Schreiber. 
District 71: Won by Amanda Swope.
District 87: Won by Ellyn Hefner. 
District 89: Won by Arturo Alonso.

Uncontested races
46 candidates were elected without an election being held. 
45 Representatives were the only candidate to file in their district.
One Representative successfully challenged the candidacy of their only opposition.

The following Representatives were re-elected without opposition:
District 2: Jim Olsen (Republican)
District 3: Rick West (Republican)
District 6: Rusty Cornwell (Republican)
District 8: Tom Gann (Republican)
District 10: Judd Strom (Republican)
District 14: Chris Sneed (Republican)
District 16: Scott Fetgatter (Republican)
District 17: Jim Grego (Republican)
District 19: Justin Humphrey (Republican)
District 22: Charles McCall (Republican)
District 25: Ronny Johns (Republican)
District 27: Danny Sterling (Republican)
District 28: Danny Williams (Republican)
District 30: Mark Lawson (Republican)
District 38: John Pfeiffer (Republican)
District 39: Ryan Martinez (Republican)
District 47: Brian Hill (Republican)
District 51: Brad Boles (Republican)
District 52: Gerrid Kendrix (Republican)
District 54: Kevin West (Republican)
District 56: Dick Lowe (Republican)
District 58: Carl Newton (Republican)
District 59: Mike Dobrinski (Republican)
District 61: Kenton Patzkowsky (Republican)
District 62: Daniel Pae (Republican)
District 67: Jeff Boatman (Republican)
District 68: Lonnie Sims (Republican)
District 72: Monroe Nichols (Democratic)
District 73: Regina Goodwin (Democratic)
District 74: Mark Vancuren (Republican)
District 75: T. J. Marti (Republican)
District 77: John Waldron (Democratic)
District 78: Meloyde Blancett (Democratic)
District 80: Stan May (Republican)
District 82: Nicole Miller (Republican)
District 86: David Hardin (Republican)
District 91: Chris Kannady (Republican)
District 92: Forrest Bennett (Democratic)
District 93: Mickey Dollens (Democratic)
District 94: Andy Fugate (Democratic)
District 96: Preston Stinson (Republican)
District 98: Dean Davis (Republican)
District 99: Ajay Pittman (Democratic)
District 101: Robert Manger (Republican)
The following Representative was elected for the first time without opposition:
District 69: Mark Tedford (Republican)
The following Representative was re-elected after successfully challenging the candidacy of their opposition:
District 65: Toni Hasenbeck (Republican)

Summary of elections
General election results will be listed for districts with general elections. Runoff results will be listed for districts where a runoff determined the winner of the district. Primary election results are listed for districts where a primary determined the winner of the district. Districts with one candidate and no results were uncontested.

Predictions

Closest races 
Seats where the margin of victory was under 10%:

Elections by District

District 1
Since only Republican candidates filed for district 1, the Republican primary on June 28 was the de facto general election. Incumbent Eddy Dempsey won reelection defeating primary challenger David Chapman.

Republican Primary
Only registered Republicans may vote in the Republican primary under Oklahoma's semi-closed primary system.

Candidates
Nominee
Eddy Dempsey, incumbent
Eliminated in primary
David Chapman

Endorsements

Results

District 4

General election

Candidates
Charles Arnall (Democratic)
Bob Ed Culver Jr., incumbent (Republican)

Endorsements

Results

District 5
Since only Republican candidates filed for district 5, the Republican primary on June 28 was the de facto general election. Incumbent Josh West won reelection defeating primary challenger Tamara Bryan.

Republican Primary
Only registered Republicans may vote in the Republican primary under Oklahoma's semi-closed primary system.

Candidates
Nominee
Josh West, incumbent  (Republican)
Eliminated in primary
Tamara Bryan (Republican)

Endorsements

Results

District 7

General election

Candidates
Steve Bashore, incumbent  (Republican)
Jason Spence (Democratic)

Endorsements

Results

District 9

General election

Candidates
Ann Marie Kennedy (Democratic)
Mark Lepak, incumbent  (Republican)

Results

District 11
Since only Republican candidates filed for district 11, the Republican primary on June 28 was the de facto general election. Primary challenger John Kane defeated one-term incumbent Wendi Stearman.

Republican Primary
Only registered Republicans may vote in the Republican primary under Oklahoma's semi-closed primary system.

Candidates
Nominee
John Kane, member of the Oklahoma Tourism and Recreation Commission (2021–Present)
Eliminated in primary
Wendi Stearman, Incumbent (2021–Present)

Endorsements

Results

District 12

General election

Candidates
Crystal LaGrone (Democratic)
Kevin McDugle, incumbent  (Republican)

Results

District 13
Incumbent Avery Frix retired to run for Oklahoma's 2nd congressional district.

Republican Primary

Candidates
Advanced to runoff
Neil Hays, former teacher and current insurance agent
Carlisa Rogers, former teacher and nursing home administrator
Eliminated in primary
Brian Jackson, professor at Northeastern State University
Steve White, employee at Love Bottling Company and board member of the Muskogee Chamber of Commerce

Endorsements

Results

Primary results

Runoff results

General election

Candidates
Jimmy Haley (Democratic)
TBD (Republican)

Endorsements

Results

District 15
Since only Republican candidates filed for district 15, the Republican primary on June 28 was the de facto general election. Incumbent Randy Randleman won reelection defeating primary challenger Angie Brinlee.

Republican Primary
Only registered Republicans may vote in the Republican primary under Oklahoma's semi-closed primary system.

Candidates
Nominee
Randy Randleman, incumbent 
Eliminated in primary
Angie Brinlee

Results

District 18
Since only Republican candidates filed for district 18, the Republican primary on June 28 was the de facto general election. Incumbent David Smith won reelection defeating primary challenger Andy Baca.

Republican Primary
Only registered Republicans may vote in the Republican primary under Oklahoma's semi-closed primary system.

Candidates
Nominee
David Smith, incumbent 
Eliminated in primary
Andy Baca

Endorsements

Results

District 20
Since only Republican candidates filed for district 20, the Republican primary on June 28 will be the de facto general election. Only registered Republicans may vote in the Republican primary under Oklahoma's semi-closed primary system.

Republican Primary

Candidates
Nominee
Sherrie Conley, incumbent 
Eliminated in primary
Anthony Mackey
Endorsements

Results

District 21
House District 21 covers the western half of Bryan County, including Durant, and the easternmost quarter of Marshall County, including about half of Lake Texoma.

Since only Republican candidates filed for district 21, the Republican primary on June 28 will be the de facto general election. Only registered Republicans may vote in the Republican primary under Oklahoma's semi-closed primary system.

Republican Primary
Incumbent Dustin Roberts is term limited and cannot seek reelection.

Candidates
Advanced to runoff
Cody Maynard, "pastor of business administration" for Victory Life Church
Dustin Reid, strategic business development advisor for Choctaw Nation, former youth mentor for Chickasaw Nation, and former Ada teacher
Eliminated in primary
Penny James, former school teacher and counselor, director of career development for the Choctaw Nation, and cattle rancher
Ryan Williams, airline pilot

Endorsements

Results

District 23

General election

Candidates
Terry O'Donnell, incumbent (Republican)
Susan Carle Young (Democratic)

Results

District 24
Since only Republican candidates filed for district 24, the Republican primary on June 28 was the de facto general election. Chris Banning won the election, defeating two-term incumbent Logan Phillips and scout leader Bobby Schultz.

Republican Primary
Only registered Republicans may vote in the Republican primary under Oklahoma's semi-closed primary system.

Candidates
Nominee
Chris Banning, air force veteran and  CEO of Banning Investment Group
Eliminated in primary
Logan Phillips, incumbent
Bobby Schultz, former CEO and scout executive of the Cimarron Council for the Boy Scouts of America.

Endorsements

Results

District 26

General election

Candidates
Gregory Hardin II, journalist, substitute teacher, and host of The Green Corn Rebellion Show
Dell Kerbs, incumbent (Republican)

Results

District 29
Since only Republican candidates filed for district 31, the Republican primary on June 28 will be the de facto general election. Only registered Republicans may vote in the Republican primary under Oklahoma's semi-closed primary system.

Republican Primary

Candidates
Nominee
Kyle Hilbert, incumbent
Eliminated in primary 
Rick Parris

Endorsements

Results

District 31
Since only Republican candidates filed for district 31, the Republican nominee will become the next representative for the district and there will be no general election.

Incumbent Republican Garry Mize, first elected in 2018, did not seek reelection in 2022.

The primary election will be held June 28. If no candidate wins a simple majority of votes in the primary, then the top two finishers will compete in an Aug. 23 runoff election.  
Republican Primary
Only registered Republicans may vote in the Republican primary under Oklahoma's semi-closed primary system.CandidatesCollin Duel, attorney at Duel Law, P.L.L.C, former United States Army Ranger, and Afghanistan War Veteran
Karmin Grider, business consultant, former vice chairwoman of the Logan County, and 2020 Republican primary candidate for Oklahoma's 31st state house district 
Logan Trainer, employee at Jackie Cooper BMW and former actor EndorsementsDistrict 32
Since only Republican candidates filed for district 32, the Republican primary on June 28 will be the de facto general election. Only registered Republicans may vote in the Republican primary under Oklahoma's semi-closed primary system.  
Republican PrimaryCandidatesRyan Dixon
Kevin Wallace, incumbentEndorsementsDistrict 33
House District 33 contains much of Payne County outside of Stillwater, and northern Logan County. It includes all or part of Coyle, Cushing, Drumright, Ingalls, Langston, Mehan, Orlando, Quay, Ripley, Stillwater, and Yale

Since only Republican candidates filed for district 33, the Republican primary on June 28 will be the de facto general election. Only registered Republicans may vote in the Republican primary under Oklahoma's semi-closed primary system.  
Republican PrimaryCandidatesBrice Chaffin
John Talley, incumbent

District 34
Republican PrimaryCandidatesMichael Baughman
Daran Johnson
Andrew Muchmore
Results
Results

Results

General electionCandidatesTrish Ranson, incumbent
Michael Baughman, Shift LeadEndorsementsDistrict 35
Republican Primary
CandidatesNomineeTy Burns, incumbentEliminated in primaryDaniel Johnson
Results

General electionCandidatesSam Jennings (Democratic)
Ty Burns, incumbent (Republican)

District 36
District 36 moved from Osage County to eastern Oklahoma County following redistricting and has no incumbent.

Since only Republican candidates filed for district 36, the Republican primary and runoff will decide the nominee instead of the November general election.  After the June 28 primary,  John George and Anita Raglin advanced to an August 23 runoff election.
Republican Primary
Only registered Republicans may vote in the Republican primary under Oklahoma's semi-closed primary system. 
CandidatesAdvanced to runoffJohn George, Oklahoma City Fraternal Order of Police Lodge 123 president (2012-2022) and Oklahoma City Police Department officer (1991–present)
Anita Raglin, accountant and co-owner of Authentic Plastering, Inc.Eliminated in primaryCharles De Furia, chairman of the Oklahoma County Planning Commission and former Luther School Board member
Donald Paden, U.S. Air Force veteran
Wade Roberts, Oklahoma National Guard member
Results
Primary results

Runoff results

District 37
Since only Republican candidates filed for district 37, the Republican primary on June 28 was the de facto general election. Ken Luttrell won reelection defeating primary challenger Joe Vaden Jr.
Republican Primary
Only registered Republicans may vote in the Republican primary under Oklahoma's semi-closed primary system.  
CandidatesNomineeKen Luttrell, incumbentEliminated in primaryJoe Vaden, Jr.

Endorsements

Results

District 40
General electionCandidatesChad Caldwell, incumbent (Republican)
Nicholas Payne (Democratic)WithdrewTaylor Venus (Republican)

 Results 

District 41
General electionCandidatesMike Bockus (Democratic)
Denise Crosswhite Hader, incumbent (Republican)

 Results 

District 42
Republican PrimaryCandidatesMatthew D. Huggans
Cynthia Roe, incumbent

General electionCandidatesSteve Jarman (Democratic)
Cynthia Roe (Republican)

 Endorsements 

 Results 

 District 43 

General electionCandidatesCassie Kinet (Independent)
Jay Steagall, incumbent (Republican)

 Results 

District 44
District 44 incumbent Emily Virgin is term limited from seeking reelection in 2022. District 44 is considered a Democratic stronghold with no Republican having contested the district since 2010.   
Democratic PrimaryDeclaredKate Bierman, former Norman city councilmember (2017-2021) and business owner
Jared Deck, board member of the Oklahoma American Civil Liberties Union, musician, and candidate for Oklahoma House District 57 in 2008Declared, but failed to fileAleisha Karjala, former Ward 2 Norman city councilor and professor of political science at the University of Science and Arts of Oklahoma.

General electionEndorsementsCandidatesR.J. Harris (Republican)
Jared Deck (Democratic)

 Results 

District 45
Republican PrimaryCandidatesDave Spaulding, former Norman city councillor (2011-2013), candidate for the Oklahoma House's 27th district in 2014, and former chair of the Cleveland County Republican Party
Teresa Sterling, retired Oklahoma City Police Department investigator and liquor store ownerEndorsementsGeneral electionEndorsementsCandidatesAnnie Menz (Democratic)
Teresa Sterling (Republican)

District 46
Republican PrimaryCandidatesSassan Moghadam
Nancy Sangirardi
Kendra Wesson

 General election EndorsementsCandidatesKendra Wesson (Republican)
Jacob Rosecrants, incumbent (Democratic)

District 48
Since only Republican candidates filed for district 48, the Republican primary on June 28 will be the de facto general election. Only registered Republicans may vote in the Republican primary under Oklahoma's semi-closed primary system.  
Republican PrimaryCandidatesApril Brown
Tammy Townley, incumbent

District 49
Since only Republican candidates filed for district 49, the Republican primary on June 28 will be the de facto general election. Only registered Republicans may vote in the Republican primary under Oklahoma's semi-closed primary system.  
Republican PrimaryCandidatesJosh Cantrell
Richard Miller

District 50
Since only Republican candidates filed for district 50, the Republican primary on June 28 will be the de facto general election. Only registered Republicans may vote in the Republican primary under Oklahoma's semi-closed primary system.  
Republican PrimaryCandidatesDeborah Campbell
Marcus McEntire, incumbent
Jennifer SengstockEndorsementsDistrict 53
Since only Republican candidates filed for district 53, the Republican primary on June 28 was the de facto general election. Incumbent Mark McBride won reelection defeating primary challenger Kathryn Stehno.
Republican Primary
Only registered Republicans may vote in the Republican primary under Oklahoma's semi-closed primary system.  
CandidatesNomineeMark McBrideEliminated in primaryKathryn Stehno
Results

District 55
District 55 contains all of Washita County and the easternmost part of Beckham County, including Elk City. It also contains small sections of Canadian County, Blaine County and Caddo County.

Incumbent Republican Todd Russ is term limited in 2022 and running for Oklahoma State Treasurer. Since only Republican candidates filed for district 55, the Republican primary on June 28 will be the de facto general election. Only registered Republicans may vote in the Republican primary under Oklahoma's semi-closed primary system.  
Republican PrimaryCandidatesNick Archer, Mayor of Elk City, Oklahoma
Tad Boone, Cordell city councilmember
Jeff Sawatzky, farmer, cattle rancher, and volunteer firefighter

District 57
Since only Republican candidates filed for district 57, the Republican primary on June 28 was the de facto general election. Incumbent Anthony Moore won reelection defeating primary challenger Kristen Poisson.  
Republican Primary
Only registered Republicans may vote in the Republican primary under Oklahoma's semi-closed primary system.  
CandidatesNomineeAnthony Moore, incumbent Eliminated in primaryKristen Poisson

Endorsements

Results

District 60
Since only Republican candidates filed for district 60, the Republican primary on June 28 was the de facto general election. Incumbent Rhonda Baker narrowly defeated primary challenger Ron Lynch for reelection. 
Republican Primary
Only registered Republicans may vote in the Republican primary under Oklahoma's semi-closed primary system.NomineeRhonda Baker, incumbentEliminated in primaryRon Lynch

District 63
General electionCandidatesTrey Caldwell, incumbent (Republican)
Shykira Smith (Democratic)WithdrewGunner Ocskai (Libertarian)

District 64
General electionCandidatesKyle Emmett Meraz (Democratic)
Zachary Walls (Independent)
Rande Worthen (Republican)

District 65
Toni Hasenbeck (Republican) won re-election after contesting the candidacy of Jennifer Kerstetter (Democratic). Kerstetter was struck from the ballot for living outside the district.

District 66
House District 66 covers the southernmost part of Osage County, including Skiatook and the western branch of Tulsa County, including Sand Springs. Incumbent Republican Jadine Nollan is term limited in 2022.

Republican Primary
The Republican primary was held on June 28. A runoff election is scheduled for August 23.
CandidatesAdvanced to runoffGabe Renfrow, nurse  
Clay Staires, former teacher, minister, and motivational speakerEliminated in primaryMike Burdge, Sand Springs city councilman and former mayor and vice mayor  
Wayne Hill, Osage County Republican Party chairman

Endorsements

Results
Primary results

Runoff results

General election
Candidates
James Rankin (Democratic)  
TBD (Republican)
Results

District 70
General electionCandidatesBrad Banks (Republican)
Suzanne Schreiber (Democrat)EndorsementsDistrict 71
General electionCandidatesMike Masters (Republican)
Amanda Swope (Democratic)

District 76
House District 76 includes parts of Tulsa and Broken Arrow.

Since only Republican candidates filed for district 76, the Republican nominee is the next representative for the district and there was no general election. Incumbent Ross Ford won reelection defeating primary challenger Timothy Brooks.

Republican Primary
Only registered Republicans may vote in the Republican primary under Oklahoma's semi-closed primary system.
CandidatesNomineeRoss Ford, incumbentEliminated in primaryTimothy Brooks, partner at Flippo Insurance and member of Arrowhead Elementary PTA

Endorsements

Results

District 79
Republican Primary
CandidatesNomineePaul Hassink, retired utilities engineerEliminated in primaryKaren Gilbert, former Tulsa City Councilor
Stan Stevens, Realtor & former public servant

Endorsements

Results

General electionCandidatesMelissa Provenzano (Democratic)
Paul Hassink (Republican)EndorsementsDistrict 83
General electionCandidatesGreg Clyde (Democratic)
Eric Roberts (Republican)
Endorsement

District 84
General electionCandidatesJeremy Lamb (Democratic)
Tammy West (Republican)EndorsementsDistrict 85
General ElectionCandidatesCyndi Munson, incumbent (Democratic)
Donna Rice-Johnson (Republican)Struck from ballotLaShanyna Nash (Republican)  lived outside districtEndorsementsDistrict 87
House District 87 covers east-central Oklahoma County, including Springdale and Bush Hills. Incumbent Collin Walke retired and did not seek reelection.
Republican PrimaryCandidatesGloria Banister, owner of  I-44 Riverside Speedway, organic farmer, and cattle rancher
Scott Esk, former Oklahoma Department of Public Safety (1999-2011) and self-employed courier
Valerie Walker, farmerEndorsementsGeneral ElectionCandidatesEllyn Hefner (Democratic)
Gloria Banister (Republican)EndorsementsDistrict 88
Democratic PrimaryCandidatesJoe Lewis
Mauree Turner, incumbent

General ElectionCandidatesJed Green (Independent)
Mauree Turner, incumbent (Democratic)EndorsementsDistrict 89
House District 89 has been vacant since January 2022 after incumbent Jose Cruz resigned.

Since only Democratic candidates filed for district 89, the Democratic primary on June 28 was the de facto general election. Arturo Alonso won the Democratic Primary for the open seat, defeating Chris Bryant and Christian Zapata in the primary.
Democratic Primary
Only registered Democrats or Independents may vote in the Democratic primary under Oklahoma's semi-closed primary system.
CandidatesNomineeArturo Alonso, former campaign volunteer for state senator Michael Brooks-JimenezEliminated in primaryChris Bryant, security guard, cab driver and hospital aid
Christian Zapata, candidate for house district 89 in 2020
Results

 Endorsements 

District 90
Democratic PrimaryCandidatesNana Abram Dankwa
Emilleo Stokes

General ElectionCandidatesJon Echols, incumbent (Republican)
Nana Abram Dankwa(Democratic)

District 95
General ElectionCandidatesTegan Malone (Democratic)
Max Wolfley, incumbent (Republican)EndorsementsDistrict 97
General ElectionCandidatesLisa Janloo (Republican)
Jason Lowe, incumbent (Democratic)EndorsementsDistrict 100
General ElectionCandidates'''
Chaunte Gilmore (Democratic)
Marilyn Stark, incumbent (Republican)

See also
2022 Oklahoma Senate election

Noted

References

House
Oklahoma House
Oklahoma House of Representatives elections